The USF Track and Field Stadium (formerly known as the USF Soccer Stadium from 1978 to 1991 and the USF Soccer and Track Stadium from 1991 to 2010) is a track and field stadium that was built in 1978. The stadium is currently home to the men's and women's track and field teams from the University of South Florida in Tampa, Florida. It also hosted the school's men's and women's soccer programs from 1978 and 1995 respectively through the end of their 2010 seasons.

History 
The 4,000-seat stadium was built in 1978 for the USF men's soccer team. The stadium was renovated to add a running track in 1991, when USF's men's and women's track and field programs were founded.

The configuration of the track was slightly altered in 1998.

In 2008, the stadium was remodeled again. The renovations included new lighting, a new state-of-the-art Mondo track surface (the same type of surface that is used in the Olympics), a new electronic scoreboard, and some aesthetic features.

In the fall of 2010, USF began construction on a new soccer stadium. The new Corbett Soccer Stadium hosted its first match on August 23, 2011, as the Bulls men's team defeated the crosstown rival University of Tampa Spartans 2–1 in the annual preseason Rowdies Cup.  The original stadium remains in use as a track and field facility and for other events.

Another new track surface was installed in 2022 to replace the one installed in 2008. For the first time, the track was made to be USF's green and gold instead of red, which had been the color since the track was added to the facility in 1991.

Events hosted 
The 4,000 capacity stadium has hosted several events throughout the years including Lamar Hunt US Open Cup matches, the NCAA Division I Men's Soccer Championship final twice, the C-USA soccer tournaments for men and women, the men's Big East soccer tournament, the C-USA track and field championships once, and the American Athletic Conference track and field championships once.

In 1984, when Tampa hosted Super Bowl XVIII at Tampa Stadium, the Washington Redskins practiced at the stadium. Concerned about the lack of privacy at the stadium, the Redskins purchased a green tarpaulin that was attached to the fence around the stadium. The Redskins donated the tarp to the university and it remained in use for many years.

In the mid-1980s the stadium hosted preseason training for the New Jersey Generals of the United States Football League (USFL), including stars Herschel Walker and Brian Sipe. The Generals' players stayed and dined at nearby Fontana Hall.

The 1990 and 1991 NCAA Division I Men's Soccer Tournament semifinal and championship games were hosted at the stadium.

The Tampa Bay Rowdies played one 1990 playoff game there before using the facility full-time in 1991 and 1992 for home games while playing in the American Professional Soccer League. The Tampa Bay Cyclones of the USISL played most of their home games there in 1995 and 1996 before moving to Jacksonville.

USF's football spring game was played at the stadium from 1998 until 2011.

References

External links
USF Track and Field Stadium at USF's website

Soccer venues in Florida
Sports venues in Tampa, Florida
Track and Field Stadium, USF
College soccer venues in the United States
Sports venues completed in 1978
Tampa Bay Rowdies sports facilities
1978 establishments in Florida
South Florida Bulls sports venues